This is a list of wrestlers who have won the top division (makuuchi) championship in professional sumo since 1909, when the current championship system was established. These official tournaments are held exclusively in Japan.

1958 to present

The first table below lists the champions since the six-tournament system was instituted in 1958. The championship is determined by the wrestler with the highest win–loss score after fifteen bouts, held at a rate of one per day over the duration of the 15-day tournament. In the event of a tie a play-off is held between the wrestlers concerned.

Names in bold mark an undefeated victory (a zenshō-yūshō). Names in italics mark a victory by a maegashira. Figures in brackets mark the number of championships earned up to that tournament for wrestlers who won the championship more than once.

*Hoshi would later become Hokutoumi. 
*Takahanada would later become the 2nd Takanohana. 
*Tamanoshima would later become the 3rd Tamanoumi. 
*Wakahanada would later become the 3rd Wakanohana. 
*Wakamisugi II would later become the 2nd Wakanohana.

1909 to 1957
The following tables list the champions before the introduction of the current tournament system.  The system was less regularized between years, with a different number of tournaments held at different times and in different venues, and often with a changing number of bouts fought in each tournament.

*tournament held in September 

*A yūshō system giving the wrestler with the best tournament record a prize was introduced by the Mainichi newspaper in the second half of 1909, and this was officially integrated by the JSA in 1926.  All tournaments predating the second tournament of 1909 did not recognize or award a championship.  As a consequence of this, yokozuna Hitachiyama had seven pre-1909 mathematical "championship" equivalents that are uncounted here, and yokozuna Tachiyama had two.
**Asashio would later become Minanogawa Tōzō

Most career championships

Official (since 1909)

Unofficial (before 1909)

^Wrestler is currently active.

See also
Glossary of sumo terms
List of active sumo wrestlers
List of past sumo wrestlers
List of sumo tournament top division runners-up
List of sumo tournament second division champions
List of sumo record holders
List of sumo stables
List of years in sumo
List of yokozuna

References

tournament winners